Dracophyllum secundum is a prostrate to semi-erect shrub found in eastern Australia. It occurs from as far south as Pigeon House Mountain north to Kendall, New South Wales on the mid north coast. A common plant in the Blue Mountains near Sydney. Found as far west as Blackheath. It is often noticed by bushwalkers for the attractive flowers and arching foliage.

Habitat
The habitat is moist rocky areas and wet cliff faces, usually on sandstone. Sites are nutrient poor with permanent moisture.

Description
Flowering occurs mainly from July to October. Flowers are pink and white. Seeds are dispersed by wind, water and gravity.

Taxonomy
This plant first appeared in scientific literature in the Prodromus Florae Novae Hollandiae in the year 1810, authored by Robert Brown.

Etymology 
The specific epithet secundum means "arranged on one side only".

References

secundum
Flora of New South Wales
Plants described in 1810